Asplundia stenophylla is a species of plant belonging to the family Cyclanthaceae. It occasionally grows terrestrially but is usually a climbing epiphyte. The stem is up to 5 m long, bearing petioles up to 44 cm long which terminate in very distinctive leaves: very deeply bifid, deeply corrugated and up to 77 cm long.

This is a commonly encountered species in cloud forests from Costa Rica to Ecuador.

References
New Species of Cyclanthaceae from southern Central America and northern South America

stenophylla
Plants described in 1937